Cyclophora anaisaria is a moth in the  family Geometridae. It is found in south-eastern Brazil.

References

Moths described in 1901
Cyclophora (moth)
Moths of South America